Swan Valley may refer to:

In Australia:
 Swan Valley (Western Australia), a region
 Swan Valley Nyungah Community

In Canada:
 Swan River Valley, a valley between the Duck and Porcupine Mountains in Manitoba
 Swan Valley Stampeders, a Manitoba Junior Hockey League team

In the United States:
 Swan Valley, Idaho 
 Swan Valley High School, Saginaw, Michigan

See also
Swan (disambiguation)